Alfonso C. "Al" Stabile is an American politician who was a New York City Council member from 1994 to 2001, representing the 32nd district of Woodhaven, Richmond Hill, Ozone Park, South Ozone Park, Howard Beach, Hamilton Beach, Lindenwood, Broad Channel and the Rockaways. He was also the Republican and Conservative candidate for Queens Borough President in 2001.

Early life and education
Stabile was born in the East New York section of Brooklyn, one of two boys born to Carmine and Concetta Stabile. He began his education at P.S. 64 and soon after his family moved to Ozone Park, Queens. He graduated John Adams High School in Ozone Park and completed his education at York College in Jamaica, Queens and the University of Maryland, College Park.

Career
In 1967, Stabile enlisted in the United States Army and served in the 6th Infantry Division. He attained the rank of Sergeant and served in the Vietnam War. After leaving the military, Stabile began working for the New York City Department of Sanitation as a driver. He married the former Sara Jane Friia in 1969 and had two children, Frank and Connie. Around this time he bought his first piece of real estate, which led to a career as a realtor. In November 1993, Stabile entered the political arena for the first time and defeated 24-year incumbent City Councilman Walter Ward. He was known affectionately to his constituents as "Big Al".

References

External links

New York City Council members
New York (state) Republicans
People from Ozone Park, Queens
Public officeholders of Rockaway, Queens
1947 births
Living people
University of Maryland, College Park alumni
People from East New York, Brooklyn
People from Howard Beach, Queens